During the Parade of Nations at the 2019 Southeast Asian Games opening ceremony, beginning at 19:00 PST (UTC+8) on 30 November 2019, athletes bearing the flags of their respective nations led their national delegations as they paraded into the Philippine Arena in Bocaue, Bulacan, preceded by their flag and placard bearer. Each flag bearer was chosen either by the nation's National Olympic Committee or by the athletes themselves. The host country, the Philippines, entered as the last team. 11 Filipina titleholders served as muses for each of the 11 participating countries.

English was used to organize the Parade of Nations as per Southeast Asian Games Federation (SEAGF) protocol.

List

References

2019 Southeast Asian Games